Eemeli Raittinen (born 3 February 2000) is a Finnish footballer who plays as a forward for AC Oulu.

References

2000 births
Living people
Finnish footballers
Association football forwards
FC Ilves players
FC Haka players
Veikkausliiga players
Ykkönen players